Chaudhry Tariq Mehmood Bajwa is a Pakistani politician who was a Member of the Provincial Assembly of the Punjab, from 2008 to May 2018.

Early life and education
He was born on 12 July 1963 in Sangla Hill.

He graduated in 2007 from Bahauddin Zakariya University and holds BA degree.

Political career
He ran for the seat of the Provincial Assembly of the Punjab as an independent candidate from Constituency PP-170 (Sheikhupura-IX) in 2002 Pakistani general election, but was unsuccessful. He received 14,846 votes and lost the seat to Asif Jillani, a candidate of Pakistan Muslim League (Q) (PML-Q).

He was elected to the Provincial Assembly of the Punjab as a candidate of Pakistan Muslim League (N) (PML-N) from Constituency PP-170 (Nankana Sahib-I) in 2008 Pakistani general election. He received 25,890 votes and defeated Asif Jillani, a candidate of Pakistan Peoples Party (PPP).

He was re-elected to the Provincial Assembly of the Punjab as a candidate of PML-N from Constituency PP-170 (Nankana Sahib-I) in 2013 Pakistani general election. He received 36,444 votes and defeated an independent candidate, Mian Ijaz Hussain Bhatti.

References

Living people
Punjab MPAs 2013–2018
1963 births
Pakistan Muslim League (N) politicians
Punjab MPAs 2008–2013